Yamatji (or Yamaji) is a Wajarri word that has at least three different meanings:
 a member of the Watjarri people 
 any Aboriginal Australian person from the Murchison region of Western Australia
 any group made up of members of different Indigenous Australian peoples, such as a Native Title Prescribed Body Corporate

Usage of the word Yamatji in reference to non-Watjarri people  has resulted from its adoption by non-Watjarri Aboriginal people from the Murchison, to describe any Aboriginal person born in that region.

Native Title claims
The Yamatji Marlpa Aboriginal Corporation (YMAC) is "recognised as a Native Title Representative Body under Section (s) 203AD of the Native Title Act 1993 (Cth) (NTA) to preserve, protect and promote the recognition of native title in the Yamatji and Marlpa regions of Western Australia (WA). As an Aboriginal corporation, YMAC is governed by the Corporations (Aboriginal and Torres Strait Islander) Act 2006 (Cth)".

There have been four executive directors of the YMAC: Wayne Warner (1996-1998); former AFL footballer Clinton Wolf (1998-2001); Roger Cook (2001-2003) and current CEO Simon Hawkins (2003–present). YMAC was until 2017 co-chaired by Pilbara representative Doris Eaton and Yamatji representative Ben Roberts. Peter Windie (Yamatji) and Natalie Parker (Pilbara) have held the positions since then.

Claims
As of 2017 the Yamatji had made two of the twelve claims for native title in the Geraldton region. One, concerning the Wajarri Yamatji, was filed in 2004. The second was filed by the Southern Yamatji in 2017.

The claim process was started in 1996, including several different groups making overlapping claims. In February 2016, a Federal Court of Australia judicial registrar  convened mediation, resulting in outstanding overlaps being resolved and the commencement of negotiations with the Western Australian Government. In 2019, more than 1,000 claimants from four different claim groups came together in the Yamatji Nation Southern Regional Agreement, which brought together the claims of Southern Yamatji, Hutt River, Mullewa Wadjari and Widi Mob groups.

There are about 9,000 traditional owners involved in the claim. It was the first time in Australia that both native title recognition and an Indigenous land use agreement have been determined simultaneously. The decision had special significance for the Yamatji people, because of the widespread physical dispossession of their lands.

As a result of the decision, Yamatji Nation will hold non-exclusive possession rights over parts of the former Barnong, Menai Hills and Kadji Kadji pastoral leases, as well as land near Wanda Nature Reserve, Lucky Bay and Aboriginal Lands Trust areas in Carnamah, Kadathini and Eneabba. It does not give them the right to control access and use of an area, but it does allow them to access, hunt and camp on this country. A conservation area will be created under joint management, empowering the traditional owners to be able to care for their country, and will offer opportunities for Indigenous ranger programs in the region.

Minister for Indigenous Australians, Ken Wyatt, stressed the significance of the decision, saying "It gives, through this determination, traditional owners a place at the table. You are no longer sitting outside waiting for a decision, you are co-developing, co-designing the future".

Boolardy/MRO ILUA

Boolardy Station, the site of the Murchison Radio-astronomy Observatory (MRO), lies on the traditional lands of the Wajarri. The Commonwealth Scientific and Industrial Research Organisation (CSIRO) and the Australian Square Kilometre Array Pathfinder (ASKAP) office have been working with a group of Wajarri Yamatji people to enable the various radio telescope projects located on the MRO to proceed. For several years leading up to 2020, negotiations have been taking place ahead of the signing of an ILUA between the Wajarri people and the CSIRO, guided by the federal Department of Industry, Innovation and Science (in 2020 the Department of Industry, Science, Energy and Resources).

About 15 traditional owners are involved in the negotiations, representing different groups. There are challenges involved in working out how to respect the cultural significance of the area, and how to build the infrastructure (ultimately part of the international Square Kilometre Array (SKA) project) with minimal disruption to the landscape. Surveys of heritage sites have been undertaken, but the work and negotiations were somewhat disrupted by the COVID-19 pandemic in Australia.

Notable Yamatji
 Mark Atkins, musician
 Ernie Dingo, actor
 Julieka Ivanna Dhu, young woman who died in police custody
 Emma Donovan, musician
 Sue Gordon
 Gnarnyarrhe Inmurray Waitairie, musician, actor, champion rodeo rider, educator, 2001 CD of original songs: Yamatji Yummadi, Blackfella By Himself.
 David Ngoombujarra, actor
 Ben Wyatt, politician
 Ken Wyatt, first Indigenous member of the Australian House of Representatives, and of mixed Yamatji, Wongi, Noongar and Irish descent
Laurie Bellotti
Tanya Oxtoby, first Indigenous captain in the Westfield W-League and Bristol City Women manager
Kevin Taylor, ex-AFL player
 Frank Mallard WA Senior Australian of the Year 2019, serviceman, elder

Notes

Citations

Sources

Aboriginal peoples of Western Australia
Mid West (Western Australia)